Argiagrion leoninum is a species of damselfly in the family Coenagrionidae. It is not endemic to Sierra Leone. It is only known from one specimen so its status is doubtful.

References 

 Dijkstra, K.-D.B. 2005.  Argiagrion leoninum.   2006 IUCN Red List of Threatened Species.   Downloaded on 9 August 2007.

Coenagrionidae
Insects of West Africa
Endemic fauna of Sierra Leone
Insects described in 1876
Taxonomy articles created by Polbot